Cheng King Ho (born 7 November 1989 in Hong Kong) is a Hong Kong professional footballer who currently plays for Hong Kong Premier League club Resources Capital. He can play as a midfielder and wing back.

International career
Cheng King Ho made his international debut for Hong Kong against Guam on 28 March 2015.

Career statistics

International

Hong Kong

Hong Kong U-23
As of 23 June 2011

Honours

Club
Eastern
 Hong Kong Premier League: 2015–16
 Hong Kong Senior Shield: 2015–16

References

External links
 

1989 births
Living people
Hong Kong footballers
South China AA players
Hong Kong First Division League players
Hong Kong Premier League players
Yuen Long FC players
TSW Pegasus FC players
Kitchee SC players
Tai Chung FC players
Hong Kong Rangers FC players
Eastern Sports Club footballers
Resources Capital FC players
Hong Kong international footballers
Association football midfielders
Association football defenders